Babak Moradi (born July 29, 1993) is an Iranian footballer who plays as a winger for Iranian club Havadar in the Persian Gulf Pro League.

References

Living people
1993 births
Association football forwards
Iranian footballers
Machine Sazi F.C. players
Foolad FC players
Malavan players
Rah Ahan players
Aluminium Arak players
Siah Jamegan players
Shahrdari Tabriz players
Foolad Yazd players
Zagros Yasuj F.C. players
Esteghlal F.C. players
People from Yasuj